Dave Gallagher is an Australian former professional rugby league footballer who played in the 1980s and 1990s. He played for Western Suburbs and the Illawarra Steelers in the NSWRL competition. Gallagher also played for Rochdale in England and Redcliffe in the Brisbane Rugby League premiership.

Playing career
Gallagher began his professional rugby league career with Redcliffe in the Brisbane Rugby League premiership. Gallagher then signed with Western Suburbs in the NSWRL and played 51 games for the club over four years. During the 1990 NSWRL off-season, Gallagher played for Rochdale in England. In 1992, he joined Illawarra and played 13 games but missed out on the clubs first ever finals campaign.

References

1966 births
Western Suburbs Magpies players
Illawarra Steelers players
Rochdale Hornets players
Redcliffe Dolphins players
Australian rugby league players
Rugby league second-rows
Living people